Gábor Tóth (born 29 November 1964) is a Hungarian wrestler. He competed at the 1988 Summer Olympics and the 1992 Summer Olympics.

References

1964 births
Living people
Hungarian male sport wrestlers
Olympic wrestlers of Hungary
Wrestlers at the 1988 Summer Olympics
Wrestlers at the 1992 Summer Olympics
Martial artists from Budapest